is a Japanese manga series written and illustrated by Tsukasa Hojo. It was serialized in Weekly Shōnen Jump from 1985 to 1991 and collected into 35 tankōbon volumes by its publisher Shueisha. The manga was adapted into an anime television series by Sunrise Studios in 1987. The anime series was popular in numerous Asian and European countries.

City Hunter spawned a media franchise consisting of numerous adaptations and spin-offs from several countries. The franchise includes four anime television series, three anime television specials, two original video animations, several animated feature films (including a film released in February 2019 and upcoming one in 2022), several live-action films (including a Hong Kong film starring Jackie Chan and a French film), video games, and a live-action Korean TV drama. It also had a spin-off manga, Angel Heart, which in turn spawned its own anime television series and a live-action Japanese TV drama.

Plot
The series follows the exploits of Ryo Saeba, a "sweeper" who is always found chasing beautiful girls and a private detective who works to rid Tokyo of crime, along with his associate or partner, Hideyuki Makimura. Their "City Hunter" business is an underground jack-of-all-trades operation, contacted by writing the letters "XYZ" on a blackboard at Shinjuku Station.

One day, Hideyuki is murdered, and Ryo must take care of Hideyuki's sister, Kaori, a tomboy who becomes his new partner in the process. However, Kaori is very susceptible and jealous, often hitting Ryo with a giant hammer when he does something perverted. The story also follows the behind-the-scenes romance between Ryo and Kaori and the way they cooperate throughout each mission.

Characters

Ryo is the main protagonist of the series. At the age of three, Ryo was the only survivor of a plane crash in Central America. He was raised as a guerilla fighter and has no knowledge of his prior identity. After the war, Ryo makes his way to the United States, before eventually moving to Tokyo.

While in Tokyo, he forms the "City Hunter" team with Hideyuki Makimura, but after Hideyuki's death, Kaori takes his place as Ryo's new partner. A highly skilled gunman, Ryo is known for executing the "one-hole shot", a series of shots that all land in exactly the same spot on the target. His preferred weapon is the Colt Python .357 Magnum.

Ryo invented the nickname Umibozu for his fellow colleague Hayato Ijuin, and he answered giving Ryo his own,  (an ironic name, because Ryo is a real pervert who tries to hit on any beautiful woman he meets or sees, failing every time). Ryo is an accomplished marksman with revolvers, semiautomatic guns, machine-pistols, rifles, carbines and crossbows; he knows hand-to-hand combat very well and drives as a real daredevil when needed; his car is a Mini.

Kaori is Ryo Saeba's partner. She is primarily responsible for arranging clients and other managerial tasks. Ryo's skirt-chasing rouses her ire more than just once. Though the partners frequently pick on fights or arguments, they actually form a great team together. She might have been mistaken as a man sometimes due to her hairstyle. She is the adoptive Hideyuki's sister, her real name being .

Hideyuki is Kaori's adopted older brother and Ryo's partner at the beginning of the series. Kaori is not related to him by blood, his father had adopted her when she was a child. He's a former police detective with a strong sense of justice. Kaori become Ryo's partner and takes over her brother's role after he is murdered by gangsters. His last wish before he died was for Ryo to take care of his sister.

Umibōzu is another "sweeper" working the rounds in Tokyo. Umibozu is a Special Forces enemy of Ryo's from the Central America conflict. Despite being on opposing forces, the two develop a friendship and mutual respect. Between his jobs, Umibozu works as waiter at the Cat's Eye café, owned by Miki, his former fellow soldier and lover. His favorite weapons are the S&W M29 .44 Magnum six-inch revolver, the Saco-Defense M60 machine-gun (sometimes he uses the M249) and the M1A6 bazooka. Despite his fearsome appearance he has a phobia of kittens, he's very shy with women and much more unselfish than Ryo. His vision is very weak because a fight he had with Ryo in Central America, when Ryo was a guerrilla fighter and Umibozu was a mercenary; since then, Umibozu wants a duel with Ryo to close that story; during the series, he will go permanently blind and he'll have to learn how to use the other four senses to move and fight; however, he decides to not retire before finishing their matter. Later Shin Kaibara, Ryo's adoptive father and former guerrilla fighter who became a drug lord, comes in Japan; his drug was tested on Ryo during his youth, causing him to attack Umibozu and his unit; when Umibozu learns this from Bloody Mary, an old acquaintance of Ryo's and daughter of the other Ryo's fatherly figure in the jungle, he joins Ryo and Kaori against Kaibara. During the last story arc he marries Miki, but she's shot by enemy soldiers deployed by a new enemy of Ryo; Umibozu enters the firefight trusting Miki won't die.

The Umibōzu is a yokai (spirit) from Japanese folklore; he's said to turn ships upside down if someone aboard talks to him; he is portrayed bald as a bōzu (Buddhist monk); the character umi means sea.

Miki was a war orphan who Umibozu found in a completely destroyed village. Contrary to her habits, Umibozu decided to take her with him and teach her everything she knew so that she would one day be able to get by on her own. Only when Miki shows her intentions of joining the Umibozu guerrilla squad will she understand that she has radically changed her life, and feeling guilty will he try to make her a "normal" girl again by abandoning her, after making her believe that he would return to the civilized world with her. Miki, however, does not give up and after much research she manages to find her Falcon and make him accept a pact: if she manages to kill Ryo Saeba, Umibozu will agree to marry her. To do this Miki will become the owner of the Cat's Eye, where Ryo will begin to go more and more often attracted by the beauty of the woman. In the end Miki will not kill Ryo, but thanks to Kaori's complicity and that of Ryo himself, she will still be able to have him next to her in the Cat's Eye, until they get married. The Cat's Eye will become a staple of the anime and a favorite bar for the two sweepers, as that's where they will always take their customers and give rise to the most spectacular fights.

Saeko is a Tokyo police detective and Reika's older sister who often outsources certain tasks to the City Hunter team. Ryo keeps a long and detailed list of what Saeko owes him for the various favours he's done for her, which she always manages to avoid paying.

Reika is Saeko's younger sister.

Media

Manga

The series ran in the shōnen manga anthology Weekly Shōnen Jump from 1985's 13th issue until 1990. The series was printed in 35 collected volumes by Shueisha under the Jump Comics range between January 15, 1986, and April 15, 1992. In these volumes the series is grouped into 55 different stories or "episodes" instead of as their original individual chapters. Each story is centred on a different female character or "heroine". The series was an 18 volume edition by Shueisha from June 18, 1996, to October 17, 1997. A third edition of 32 volumes was published by Tokuma Shoten from December 16, 2003, to April 15, 2005. To celebrate the 30th anniversary of the series, a fourth edition City Hunter XYZ edition is being published by Tokuma Shoten across twelve volumes. The first volume was published on July 18, 2015. The eighth volume was published on October 20, 2015.

Takehiko Inoue was an assistant on the series.

Attempts were made to license the series for the American comic market during the 1980s; however, Hojo insisted the manga should be released in the right-to-left format. In 2002 Coamix created an American subsidiary, Gutsoon! Entertainment. City Hunter was a flagship title in their Raijin Comics anthology. Raijin switched from a weekly format to a monthly format before being cancelled after 46 issues.

In 2012, the series was available to read in Japanese as an iPhone application by Rainbow Apps. However, by October 31, 2016, the service was officially terminated.

In 2001, Hojo started a spin-off series titled Angel Heart. The series takes place in a universe parallel to City Hunter, where the character of Kaori Makimura is killed and her heart transplanted into Xiang-Ying, Angel Heart'''s protagonist.

A spin-off manga titled Kyō Kara City Hunter was launched July 25, 2017, in Tokuma Shoten's Monthly Comic Zenon magazine. It is centered around a 40-year-old unmarried woman who is a fan of Ryō Saeba and the City Hunter manga, and suddenly dies in a train accident and is reincarnated into the world of City Hunter.

In 2022, Coamix's Mangahot service publishes City Hunter manga in English. The series are now finally available in English on Mangahot's website.

Anime

The series was adapted into an anime series produced by Sunrise, directed by Kanetsugu Kodama and broadcast by Yomiuri Television. City Hunter was broadcast for 51 episodes between April 6, 1987, and March 28, 1988, and released on 10 VHS cassettes between December 1987 and July 1988. City Hunter 2 was broadcast for 63 episodes between April 8 and July 14 and released on 10 VHS cassettes between August 1988 and March 1990. City Hunter 3 was broadcast for 13 episodes from October 15, 1989, to January 21, 1990, and released on 6 VHS cassettes between November 1990 and April 1991. City Hunter '91 was broadcast between April 28 and October 10, 1991, and released on 6 VHS cassettes between February and July 1992. The series was later reissued as 20 video compilations.

A 32-disc DVD boxset, City Hunter Complete, was published by Aniplex and released in Japan on August 31, 2005. The set contained all four series, the TV specials and animated movies as well as an art book and figures of Ryo and Kaori. 26 of the discs comprising the four series were then released individually between December 19, 2007, and August 27, 2008. 30,000 box sets were sold, grossing , in Japan.

The series was licensed by ADV Films for release in North America; they announced their acquisition in May 1998 at Project A-Kon 9. The first City Hunter series was released on the ADV Fansubs label in March 2000. The aim of this label was to provide cheaper subtitled-only VHS releases at a faster pace than usual. The series was scheduled for 13 tapes, consisting of four episodes each. The tapes could be ordered individually or as a subscription service.

ADV later released the series on DVD. The first series was released as two boxsets of 5 discs on July 29, 2003. City Hunter 2 was released as another two boxsets of five discs on October 28, and November 18, 2003. City Hunter 3 was released as a single boxset on December 2, 2003, and City Hunter '91 was released on December 16, 2003.

For the 30th anniversary of the original manga, buyers of all 12 volumes of City Hunter XYZ edition were entitled receive a "motion graphic anime" DVD. The DVDe adapted a special Angel Heart chapter entitled Ryo's proposal and was voiced by the original City Hunter cast. On April 20, 2019, Discotek Media announced that they had licensed the entire City Hunter animated franchise, including the 2019 movie, Shinjuku Private Eyes. The first 26 episodes were released February 25, 2020.

Theatrical movies
Three theatrical movies were released in 1989 and 1990: .357 Magnum was released on June 17, 1989, Bay City Wars was released on August 25, 1990, and Million Dollar Conspiracy was released on August 25, 1990.

ADV Films released a DVD containing Bay City Wars and Million Dollar Conspiracy as well as a bonus television episode on June 3, 2003.

A new theatrical movie produced by Aniplex that is set in present-day Shinjuku titled City Hunter the Movie: Shinjuku Private Eyes premiered in Japan on February 8, 2019, after Sunrise and Kenji Kodama returned to animate and direct the film, respectively. The Kisugi sisters of Cat's Eye appeared in the film as a crossover. Teruo Satoh and Takahiko Kyōgoku served as episode directors, while Kumiko Takahashi designed the characters and Taku Iwasaki composed the music. The film debuted No. 4 at the Japanese box office, where it has grossed  as of March 17, 2019. The film earned  by April 15, 2019, in two months since its release, becoming the third top-grossing Japanese anime film of 2019 up until then, and it had grossed  in Japan by the end of 2019. Shinjuku Private Eyes was released in France on June 13, 2019. Philippe Lacheau, the director and star of the French live-action film adaptation Nicky Larson et le Parfum de Cupidon, was involved with the French distribution of Shinjuku Private Eyes. Discotek Media premiered the English dub of the movie at Otakon 2019.

During their panel at Otakon 2022, Discotek Media announced that they licensed all the previously licensed ADV Films film releases and City Hunter: Death of the Vicious Ryo Saeba.

A new film was announced in 2022.

Television movies
Three television movies were produced: The Secret Service was broadcast on January 5, 1996, which was followed by Goodbye My Sweetheart on April 25, 1997, and Death of Vicious Criminal Ryo Saeba on April 23, 1999.

ADV Films released Goodbye, My Sweetheart as City Hunter: The Motion Picture in North America as their first release from the franchise.

Live action
Hong Kong films

In 1993, a live-action Hong Kong theatrical adaptation of the series was released. The film was directed by Wong Jing and starred Jackie Chan as Ryo Saeba, Wang Zuxian as Kaori, and Japanese idol Kumiko Goto.Animerica 1–2 pg13 During filming of the movie, Chan dislocated his shoulder. The movie has been criticised by Chan. Fortune Star and 20th Century Fox later released it on R1 DVD along with other budget classic HK films.Saviour of the Soul (九一神鵰俠侶 Gauyat sandiu haplui) is a live-action Hong Kong film from 1991 that uses the characters from City Hunter but changes the plot. In 1996, Mr. Mumble kept the concept of City Hunter but changed the characters' names.

French film

A separate French action comedy film Nicky Larson et le Parfum de Cupidon (lit. "Nicky Larson and Cupid's Perfume") was released in France on February 6, 2019. The French adaptation has Philippe Lacheau as director as well as the star, playing the title character Nicky Larson (as Ryo Saeba is known in the French dubs of the anime series). Elodie Fontan appears beside Lacheau as Laura Marconi (Kaori Makimura), while Tarek Boudali, Julien Arruti, and Didier Bourdon also appear in the film as per its initial promotional material. Pamela Anderson also appears in the film.

Netflix film
In December 2022, Netflix announced a live-action film adaptation in the works with lead actor Ryohei Suzuki as Ryo Saeba. Directed by Yūichi Satō, the film is scheduled for a 2024 release on the streaming service.

Chinese film
In 2016, a new Chinese film based on City Hunter was announced to be in development. It was announced that it would be directed by Hong Kong filmmaker Stanley Tong and star Chinese actor Huang Xiaoming as Ryo Saeba.

Television series

A planned live-action television series of City Hunter was announced in 2008, to be produced and distributed by Fox Television Studios and South Korean media company SSD.

Jung Woo-sung, was scheduled to play Ryo alongside Hollywood-based stars, with location filming in Seoul and Tokyo. In 2011, the series was adapted into a Korean television series of the same name  by SBS, starring Lee Min-ho and Park Min-young. The series is available to watch with English subtitles on the streaming service Hulu.

In 2014, there was a Chinese television series based on City Hunter, with the title 城市猎人 (Cheng Shi Lie Ren). In 2015, the spin-off manga Angel Heart received its own live-action Japanese TV drama adaptation.

Musical
In 2021, the Takarazuka Revue produced a musical version titled . It was performed at the Takarazuka Grand Theater from August 7 to September 13, 2021 and then at the Tokyo Takarazuka Theater from October 2 to November 14. The musical starred Sakina Ayakaze as Ryo Saeba and Kiwa Asazuki as Kaori Makimura.

Video gamesCity Hunter was released by Sunsoft for the PC Engine in March 1990.

Ryo appears as a playable character in the fighting game Jump Force.

Reception
Manga
By 2016, the City Hunter manga series had sold over 50million tankōbon volumes worldwide. In addition, the series was circulated in an estimated 900million copies of Weekly Shōnen Jump manga magazine between 1985 and 1991, with those Jump issues generating an estimated . The series voted as the 19th "Most Powerful" series to have featured in Shonen Jump. On TV Asahi's Manga Sōsenkyo 2021 poll, in which 150.000 people voted for their top 100 manga series, City Hunter ranked 57th.

In Manga: The Complete Guide, Jason Thompson described the manga stories as "well told and entertaining". Writing for Mania.com, Eduardo M. Chavez describes the series as "funny, sexy, action packed and at times just plain whacked" and praises the mix of action and comedy. Patrick King of Animefringe described the series as "not the most intellectually stimulating piece of fiction I've experienced lately" but called it "a blast to read".

Anime
In a 2005 poll held by TV Asahi, City Hunter was voted 66th out of the 100 most popular animated TV series, as voted by TV viewers. A TV Asahi web-poll voted City Hunter 65th.

The characters Ryo and Kaori proved popular with fans. In the reader voted Animage Anime Grand Prix Saeba Ryo was voted second in the "Best Male Character" section in 1988. In 1989, 1990 and 1991 he was voted first. In 1992, he was voted sixth. Kaori Makamura was voted fifteenth in the "Best Female Character" category in 1988 before climbing to eighth in 1989. She then placed fifth in 1990 before falling to sixth and eleventh in 1991 and 1992, respectively.The Motion Picture has been praised for the quality of its English dub but criticised for changing the characters names.

The first anime ending theme, "Get Wild" by TM Network, and a later 1989 remix, sold a combined 515,010 singles in Japan. The anime series was also popular in France, where it was dubbed as Nicky Larson and 140 episodes aired in the early 1990s.

Box office

Legacy
A replica of Kaori's "100-ton hammer" raised  ($17,150) on Yahoo Auctions in 2007. It was the biggest selling charity item of the year for the service.

In 2012, the characters of Ryo, Kaori and Umibozu appeared in a video for the virtual musician Mana. Mana is a collaboration between Hojo and Tetsuya Komuro of TM Network.

The cover for the 2015 Chris Brown single "Zero" was allegedly copied from one of Hojo's City Hunter'' sketches.

Notes

References

External links
  
 
 

 
1987 anime television series debuts
1988 anime television series debuts
1989 anime films
1989 anime television series debuts
1990 anime OVAs
1991 anime television series debuts
1996 anime films
1997 anime films
1999 anime films
2019 anime films
Action anime and manga
ADV Films
Anime films based on manga
Anime television films
Aniplex
Comedy anime and manga
Detective anime and manga
Discotek Media
Manga adapted into films
Nippon TV original programming
Shōnen manga
Shueisha franchises
Shueisha manga
Sunrise (company)
Yomiuri Telecasting Corporation original programming